Ran HaCohen (born 1964) is an Israeli scholar, university teacher, and translator known for his strong criticism of Israel's policies. Having graduated from university with a B.A. in Computer Science, an M.A. in Comparative Literature and a Ph.D. in Jewish Studies, he works as a literary translator of German, English and Dutch and Ethiopic. Occasionally, he writes for the Antiwar.com website.

Awards and recognition
In 2010, HaCohen was awarded the Tchernichovsky Prize for exemplary translation for his Hebrew translation of the Ethiopian national epic, Kebra Nagast.
In 2020, HaCohen was awarded the  Dutch Foundation for Literature’s Translation Prize in recognition of his excellent translations of both classic and contemporary Dutch fiction into Hebrew, and his important role as an intermediary on behalf of Dutch literature in Israel.

References

External links

Tel Aviv University page
Letter from Israel

1964 births
Living people
Israeli political writers
Israeli literary critics
Israeli translators